Rákóczi's War of Independence (1703–1711) was the first significant attempt to topple the rule of the Habsburgs over Hungary. The war was conducted by a group of noblemen, wealthy and high-ranking progressives and was led by Francis II Rákóczi and resigned soldiers and peasants fought alongside the noblemen. The insurrection was unsuccessful, ending with the Treaty of Szatmár; however, the Hungarian nobility managed to partially satisfy Hungarian interests.

Prelude
With the Treaty of Karlowitz in 1699, the Ottoman Empire renounced almost all of its claims to some of its territories, which were conquered from the medieval Kingdom of Hungary after 1526. The nobility was against Habsburg rule because the lands formerly taken away from them by the Ottomans were returned only to those who could prove their right to own the property and could pay 10% of its worth to the Habsburgs. If they failed to do so, the property went to creditors of the Empire. The peasant class turned against the Empire because of the hardships the long wars brought upon them. In 1697 an anti-Habsburg uprising in Tokaj was suppressed. However, relations between the court and the nobility were deteriorating, and the new Habsburg rulers treated the peasants so poorly that eventually some people wished for a return to Turkish rule.

Uprising

International relations provided Hungarians with an opportunity to liberate themselves from the Habsburgs. With the help of King Louis XIV of France, anti-Habsburg rebels, led by  young nobleman Imre Thököly, rose against the Empire in 1678. Thököly occupied most of Northern Hungary. In 1681, the Ottomans joined to help him, and he was recognised as King of Upper Hungary by Sultan Mehmed IV. However, when the Ottomans lost the battle of Vienna in 1683, Thököly lost Ottoman support and was eventually defeated in 1685. His alliance with the Ottomans changed the positive perception Western Europe had about Hungary, and instead of being thought of as the bastion of Christianity, the country was now being thought of as an enemy, Partly as a consequence, Hungary was occupied and organised as "newly acquired territory" instead of "territory liberated from the Ottomans".

Leadership

Francis II Rákóczi was the son of an old noble family and one of the richest landlords in the Kingdom of Hungary. He was the count (comes perpetuus) of the Comitatus Sarossiensis (in Hungarian Sáros) from 1694 on. He was born to Francis I Rákóczi, elected ruling prince of Transylvania, and Ilona Zrínyi, in 1676. His father died when Rákóczi was a mere baby, and his mother married Imre Thököly in 1682. After Thököly was defeated, Zrínyi held the castle of Munkács (today Mukacheve in Ukraine) for three years but was eventually forced to surrender. After the Treaty of Karlowitz, when his stepfather and mother were sent into exile, Rákóczi had stay in Vienna under Habsburg supervision.

Remnants of Thököly's peasant army started a new uprising in the Hegyalja region of northeastern present-day Hungary, which was part of the property of the Rákóczi family. They captured the castles of Tokaj, Sárospatak and Sátoraljaújhely, and asked Rákóczi to become their leader, but he was not eager to head what appeared to be a minor peasant rebellion. He quickly returned to Vienna, where he tried his best to clear his name. Rákóczi then befriended Count Miklós Bercsényi, whose property at Ungvár (today Ужгород (Uzhhorod), in Ukraine), lay next to his own. Bercsényi was a highly educated man, the third richest man in the kingdom (after Rákóczi and Simon Forgách), and was related to most of the Hungarian aristocracy.

Fight for independence

As the House of Habsburg was on the verge of dying out, France was looking for allies in its fight against Austrian hegemony. Consequently, they established contact with Rákóczi and promised support if he took up the cause of Hungarian independence. An Austrian spy seized this correspondence and brought it to the attention of the Emperor. As a direct result of this, Rákóczi was arrested on 18 April 1700 and imprisoned in the fortress of Wiener Neustadt (south of Vienna). It became obvious during the preliminary hearings that, just as in the case of his grandfather Péter Zrínyi, the only possible sentence for Francis was death. With the aid of his pregnant wife Amelia and the prison commander, Rákóczi managed to escape and flee to Poland. Here he met with Bercsényi again, and together they resumed contact with the French court.

Three years later, the War of the Spanish Succession caused a large part of the Austrian forces in the Kingdom of Hungary to temporarily leave the country. Taking advantage of the situation, kuruc forces began a new uprising in Munkács, and Rákóczi was asked to head it. He decided to invest his energies in a war of national liberation, and accepted the request. On 15 June 1703, another group of about 3000 armed men headed by Tamás Esze joined him near the Polish city of Lawoczne (today Lavochne, a village in Ukraine). Bercsényi also arrived, with French funds and 600 Polish mercenaries.

Most of the Hungarian nobility did not support Rákóczi's uprising, because they considered it to be no more than a jacquerie, a peasant rebellion. Rákóczi's famous call to the nobility of Szabolcs County seemed to be in vain. He did manage to convince the Hajdús (emancipated peasant warriors) to join his forces, so his forces controlled most of Kingdom of Hungary to the east and north of the Danube by late September 1703. He continued by conquering Transdanubia soon after.

Since the Austrians had to fight Rákóczi on several fronts, they felt obliged to enter negotiations with him. However, the victory of Austrian and English forces against a combined French-Bavarian army in the Battle of Blenheim on 13 August 1704, provided an advantage not only in the War of the Spanish Succession, but also prevented the union of Rákóczi's forces with their French-Bavarian allies.

This placed Rákóczi into a difficult military and financial situation. French support gradually diminished, and a larger army was needed to occupy the already-won land. Meanwhile, supplying the current army with arms and food was beyond his means. He tried to solve this problem by creating a new copper-based coinage, which was not easily accepted in Hungary as people were used to silver coins. Nevertheless, Rákóczi managed to maintain his military advantage for a while – but after 1706, his army was forced into retreat.

A meeting of the Hungarian Diet (consisting of 6 bishops, 36 aristocrats and about 1000 representatives of the lower nobility of 25 counties), held near Szécsény (Nógrád County) in September 1705, elected Rákóczi to be the "fejedelem"- (ruling) prince – of the Confederated Estates of the Kingdom of Hungary, to be assisted by a 24-member Senate. Rákóczi and the Senate were assigned joint responsibility for the conduct of foreign affairs, including peace talks. 
 
Encouraged by England and the Netherlands, peace talks started again on 27 October 1705 between the kuruc leaders and the Emperor. However, military operations continued and both sides varied their strategy according to the military situation. On 13 December Kuruc forces led by János Bottyán defeated the Austrians at Szentgotthárd. One stumbling block was sovereignty over Transylvania – neither side was prepared to give it up. Rákóczi's proposed treaty with the French was stalled, so he became convinced that only a declaration of independence would make it acceptable for various powers to negotiate with him. In 1706, his wife (whom he had not seen in 5 years, along with their sons József and György) and his sister were both sent as peace ambassadors, but Rákóczi rejected their efforts on behalf of the Emperor.

On Rákóczi's recommendation, and with Bercsényi's support, another meeting of the Diet held at Ónod (Borsod County) declared the deposition of the House of Habsburg from the Hungarian throne on 13 June 1707. But neither this act, nor the copper currency issued to avoid monetary inflation, were successful. Louis XIV refused to enter into treaties with Prince Rákóczi, leaving the Hungarians without allies. There remained the possibility of an alliance with the Russian Tsardom, but this did not materialize either.

At the Battle of Trenčín (Hungarian Trencsén, German Trentschin, Latin Trentsinium, Comitatus Trentsiniensis, today in Slovakia), on 3 August 1708 Rákóczi's horse stumbled, and he fell to the ground, which knocked him unconscious. The kuruc forces thought him dead and fled. This defeat was fatal for the uprising. Numerous Kuruc leaders transferred their allegiance to the Emperor, hoping for clemency. Rákóczi's forces became restricted to the area around Munkács and Szabolcs County. Not trusting the word of János Pálffy, who was the Emperor's envoy charged with negotiations with the rebels, the Prince left the Kingdom of Hungary for Poland on 21 February 1711.

Serbian participation and other Royalists
The Serbs (settled in the southern borders of Hungary during the Great Serb Migrations and protected by the Austrians) fought on the Emperor's side since the beginning of the war. They were used as the light cavalry in the Austrian army and as tax collectors. During the eight years of war Hungarian villages and towns of the Great Hungarian Plain and Transdanubia were burnt and robbed by the Serbs, while in Bácska Serb villages were burnt. However, there were some Serbs who fought on Rakóczi's side against the Habsburgs – the Frontiersmen of Semlak. The leader of the Kuruc Serb troops was Frontier Captain Obrad Lalić from Senta.

Croatia also supported the Habsburg Monarchy, thus the Croatian Army and the Habsburg contingents precluded the Kuruc occupation of Croatia. Croatian and Serbian forces fought in Transdanubia and Upper Hungary. The Transylvanian Saxons also distanced themselves from Rákóczi in 1703. Although Austrian General Rabutin lost in Transylvania, he retreated into the Saxonland, where the Saxon towns and peasants gave shelter to the Habsburg Army. Clashes between the Kuruc and Habsburg-Saxon army took place throughout Croatia.

Danish assistance
The Kingdom of Denmark annually provided cavalry and infantry regiments. The Habsburg army stationed these Danish regiments in Hungary and the Danish soldiers fought along with the Habsburg army against the Hungarians (Kurucs) and their allies. The Danish forces fought in Eastern Hungary and Transylvania (Battle of Zsibó).

Mercenaries and minorities in the Kuruc army

The Rusyn minority in 1703 immediately joined the uprising, but before that between 1690 and 1702 the Rusyns supported the Hungarians against the Austrian soldiers. Also during the conflict all along the Slovaks fought for Rákóczi. In the Kuruc army there were Slovak commanders and a few Kuruc forces were completely Slovak. After the enfranchisement of Transylvania the Romanian minority stood en masse with the Kurucs, and supported the Romanian Kuruc forces. Finally, a few hundred mercenaries from Wallachia and Moldavia fought in Rákóczi's army.

Scores of Polish volunteers and mercenaries came from Poland, also many soldiers were Ukrainians and Lipka Tatars, they supported the Kurucs. Several times Rákóczi asked for help from Poland and endeavored to recruit more Polish soldiers. In the Hungarian lands the Germans Spiš Saxons and some German groups (including renegades from the Habsburg Army) joined Rákóczi's war. They were supplemented by German mercenaries. The Kuruc Army also used commands and oaths in both the Slovak and German languages, since there were so many Germans and Slovaks who served in the Kuruc army.

The Hungarian Slovenes from the counties of Murska Sobota, Lendava and Szentgotthárd joined the fight against the Habsburg soldiers, since the Styrian forces several times foraged in the Slovene villages.

A few hundred Swedish soldiers broke away from the Battle of Poltava, Benderi and Poland in Hungary. In 1710 Rákóczi admitted the Swedes into the demoralized Kuruc army. The Hungarian-Polish-Swedish-French army was close to victory against the Austrians in the Battle of Romhány, but the last of Rákóczi's forces was crushed in the course of the Austrian counterattack.

Rákóczi's army also included Bulgarians, Lithuanians, Crimean Tatars and Ottomans.

See also 

 Simontornya Castle, used as a stronghold by Kuruc rebels

References

 
Conflicts in 1703
Conflicts in 1704
Conflicts in 1705
Conflicts in 1706
Conflicts in 1707
Conflicts in 1708
Conflicts in 1709
Conflicts in 1710
Conflicts in 1711
18th-century rebellions
Wars involving Hungary
Wars of independence
Wars involving Denmark
Wars involving France
Hungary under Habsburg rule
Revolutions in Hungary
1700s in the Habsburg monarchy
18th century in Hungary
1710s in the Habsburg monarchy
1703 in the Habsburg monarchy
1711 in the Habsburg monarchy
Wars involving the Habsburg monarchy
Rebellions against the Habsburg monarchy
18th-century military history of Croatia
1703-06-15